New York's 26th State Senate district is one of 63 districts in the New York State Senate. It has been represented by Democrat Brian Kavanagh since his victory in a 2017 special election to replace retiring fellow Democrat Daniel Squadron. Franklin D. Roosevelt, eventual governor and U.S. president, represented this district from 1911 to 1913 under completely different lines.

Geography
District 26 covers much of lower Manhattan and the western Brooklyn coastline, including Tribeca, Chinatown, the Lower East Side, and the Financial District, as well as parts of Dumbo, Greenpoint, Williamsburg, Brooklyn Heights, Cobble Hill, Downtown Brooklyn, SoHo, and the East Village.

The district overlaps with New York's 7th, 8th, 10th, and 12th congressional districts, and with the 50th, 51st, 52nd, 53rd, 65th, 66th, and 74th districts of the New York State Assembly.

Recent election results

2020

2018

2017 special

2016

2014

2012

Federal results in District 26

References

26